El Milga is an important district in Saint Catherine city, situated in the South Sinai Governorate of Egypt. Along with other neighbourhoods, it forms Saint Catherine's downtown area.

Populated places in South Sinai Governorate